Washington Middle School is the name of many middle schools, usually named after George Washington, including:

Washington Middle School (Vista, California)
Washington Middle School (Calumet, Michigan)
Washington Middle School (Seattle, Washington)

See also
George Washington Middle School (disambiguation)